Pabitra Kumar Giri (1955 – 20 May 2010) was an Indian urban economist, who during 1998–2010, served as the Director of the Centre for Urban Economic Studies at the  University of Calcutta in Kolkata, India.

Education
He graduated from the Scottish Church College, and the University of Calcutta, from where he earned his doctorate in economics.

Selected works

Books
The Flow of Resources in the Regional Economy of West Bengal: The Trends and Processes During 1960-61 to 1970-71 VDM Publishing, 2010

Journal articles
Urbanisation in West Bengal, 1951-1991 Economic and Political Weekly Vol - XXXIII No. 47-48, 21 November 1998
Interaction between Trading Capital and Productive Capital in Agriculture-An Unexplained Reciprocity (with Debdas Banerjee) Economic and Political Weekly Vol - XIX No. 46, 17 November 1984

Research projects
Preparation of Long-term and Short-term Strategy of Howrah Development and Rejuvenation Plan (HDRP)

References

20th-century Indian economists
Scottish Church College alumni
University of Calcutta alumni
Academic staff of the University of Calcutta
Academic staff of the University of Kalyani
Bengali people
1955 births
2010 deaths
Scholars from West Bengal